The 2021–22 season is Swindon Town's 143rd year in their history and first season back in League Two since the 2019–20 season, following relegation from League One.  The club will also compete in the FA Cup, EFL Trophy and the EFL Cup.  The season covers the period from 1 July 2021 to 30 June 2022.

Managerial changes
On 26 May 2021, John McGreal was named as the new first team manager, signing a two year contract. On 1 June 2021, McGreal named Rene Gilmartin as his assistant. However, on 25 June 2021, with increasing uncertainty regarding the ownership of the club, both McGreal and Gilmartin left by mutual consent. McGreal was in the job for just 30 days. Long-standing chief executive Steve Anderson also left the club on the same day. A few days later, director of football Paul Jewell stood down from his position. On 20 July 2021, Clem Morfuni was named the new owner and chairman of Swindon Town  On 21 July 2021, Ben Garner was appointed head coach with Scott Lindsey and Scott Marshall appointed as assistant managers. Also Ben Chorley was appointed the clubs new director of football. On 22 July 2021, Rob Angus was appointed new Chief Executive. On 13 August 2021, Zavier Austin was appointed vice chairman.

Pre-season friendlies
Swindon Town announced friendlies against Melksham Town, Hungerford Town, Swansea City (later cancelled), Swindon Supermarine, Weymouth, Barnet (later cancelled),
and Peterborough United as part of their pre-season preparations.

Competitions

League Two

League table

Results summary

Results by matchday

Matches
Swindon Town's League Two fixtures were announced on 24 June 2021.

Play-offs

Town League Two Play-Offs Semi-Finals against Port Vale both legs shown  Live on Sky Sports.

FA Cup

Town were drawn away to Crewe Alexandra in the first round. Town were drawn away to Walsall in the Second round. Town were drawn Home to Manchester City in the Third round.

EFL Cup

Town were drawn away to Cambridge United in the first round.

EFL Trophy

Swindon were drawn into Southern Group F alongside Newport County, Plymouth Argyle and Arsenal U21 Swindon were drawn against Colchester United in the last 32.

Statistics
Players with names in italics and marked * were on loan from another club for the whole of their season with Swindon Town.

|-
!colspan=14|Players who left the club:

|}

Goals record

Disciplinary record

Management disciplinary record

Suspension

Clean sheets

Summary

Awards

Players

Management

International call-ups

Transfers

Transfers in

Loans in

Loans out

Transfers out

References

Swindon Town
Swindon Town F.C. seasons